The Bloc Montreal is a provincial political party in Quebec. It represents the interests of Montreal residents. The party ran thirteen candidates in the Greater Montreal Area during the 2022 Quebec general election.

Policies
Bloc Montreal leader Balarama Holness has indicated that the party supports the idea of Montreal being a bilingual city state.

Election Results

2022 Quebec general elections 
Bloc Montreal has gotten 7,744 votes in the 2022 Quebec general election, with a share of 0.2%.  All thirteen candidates have lost, meaning that Bloc Montreal hasn't won a seat in this election.

See also
Equality Party
Canadian Party of Quebec
Partition of Quebec
Proposal for the Province of Montreal

References

External links
Official website - Bloc Montreal

2022 establishments in Quebec
Political parties of minorities
Political parties established in 2022
Quebec Anglophone culture
Provincial political parties in Quebec
Organizations based in Montreal